Parliamentary elections were held in Madagascar on 6 September 1970. The result was a victory for the ruling Social Democratic Party, which won 104 of the 107 seats in the National Assembly. Voter turnout was 95%.

Results

References

Elections in Madagascar
Madagascar
Parliamentary
Madagascar
Election and referendum articles with incomplete results